The Liverpool Civil and Family Court, Vernon Street Liverpool, England. It is operated by Her Majesty's Courts Service.

The building contains the city's county court and family court.

References

Court buildings in Liverpool
Buildings and structures in Liverpool
County courts in England and Wales
Liverpool